The Mogilan mound or Mogilanska mound is a burial mound in the center of Vratsa, Bulgaria.

During excavations in 1965–66, 3 tombs were found in it, built of stone. One of them - tomb No 2, was found intact and yielded a rich treasure-trove of artifacts. 

Tomb No 2 consists of an anteroom and a chamber. In the anteroom there was a chariot and the remains of a sacrificed horse, whose ammunition has a complete set of silver decorations. In the chamber there was a funeral with many treasures: a gold wreath and earrings, a gilded silver knee pad with an image of the great mother goddess, a set of magic figurines, as well as different vessels and objects made of silver, bronze and ceramics. Some vessels bear the name of the Odrysian ruler Cotys I. 

The other two tombs were looted in antiquity and yielded only a small amount of random objects – a gold and silver jug and others. It is likely that prominent members of the ruler dynasty of the Triballi were buried in those tombs in the 4th century BC.

The artifacts are stored in the regional historical muzeum of Vratsa.

See also
Thracian tomb of Aleksandrovo
Thracian tomb Golyama Arsenalka
Thracian tomb Griffins
Thracian tomb Helvetia
Thracian Tomb of Kazanlak
Thracian tomb Ostrusha
Thracian tomb of Seuthes III
Thracian tomb Shushmanets
Thracian Tomb of Sveshtari
Valley of the Thracian Rulers
Roman Tomb (Silistra)

Tombs in Bulgaria
Thracian sites

References 

Tombs in Bulgaria
Thracian sites
History of Vratsa Province